Edeyrnion could refer to:

 Edeirnion (antiquarian form: Edeyrnion), a medieval Welsh cantref and area of Gwynedd
 Edeyrnion Rural District, a former administrative district